Jai Balaji may refer to:

Jai Balaji group, an Indian firm
Jai Balaji (film), a 1976 Tamil film